KDSU (91.9 FM) is a radio station licensed to Fargo, North Dakota. The station is owned by North Dakota State University, but is operated by Prairie Public Radio.  It airs NPR news and talk programming for most of the day, but simulcasts KFJM's Roots, Rock and Jazz programming from 9 am to 3 pm and from 8 pm to 4 am on weekdays.  The rest of the main Prairie Public Radio network airs classical music during these times.

KDSU shares its coverage area with Moorhead, Minnesota-based Minnesota Public Radio outlets KCCD and KCCM, making Fargo/Moorhead one of the smallest markets with competing NPR member stations.

History

In 1952, students at the then-North Dakota Agricultural College signed on a very low-powered campus AM carrier current station. It adopted the fictional call letters "KDSC""; since the station didn't need a license, this was never officially assigned by the Federal Communications Commission. The station began using "KDSU" as an identifier sometime in the early 1960s, after the college became North Dakota State University. It went off the air in 1964 due to technical difficulties.

It returned in 1966 as a fully licensed FM station, now officially assigned the KDSU call letters. It originally tried to satisfy all tastes, airing jazz, blues, folk music, classical music, rock and opera. By 1981, however, it had evolved into a more traditional public radio station, airing news and jazz during the week and specialty programming on weekends.

External links
Prairie Public radio website
KDSU Schedule

DSU
DSU
NPR member stations
Radio stations established in 1966
1966 establishments in North Dakota